The Metallic Muse is a collection of science fiction stories by Lloyd Biggle, Jr., published in hardcover by Doubleday Books in 1972. It was reprinted in paperback by DAW Books in 1973.

Contents
 "The Tunesmith" (If 1957)
 "Leading Man" (Galaxy 1957)
 "Spare the Rod" (Galaxy 1958)
 "Orphan of the Void" (Fantastic 1960)
 "Well of the Deep Wish" (If 1961)
 "In His Own Image" (F&SF 1968)
 "The Botticelli Horror" (Fantastic 1960)

"Orphan of the Void" was originally published as "The Man Who Wasn't Home."

Reception
Theodore Sturgeon noted that Biggle's stories "are usually constructed around an idea or solution withheld until the punchline. . . . a valid technique, except where the reader gets to the punchline first."

References

1972 short story collections
Science fiction short story collections
Doubleday (publisher) books